Magdeburg-Hasselbachplatz station is a railway station in Magdeburg, capital city of Saxony-Anhalt, Germany, located near the Hasselbachplatz.

Operation
The station is closed from 4 March 2018 until 12 May 2019 due to effects of the construction site at Magdeburg Hauptbahnhof.

Notable places nearby
Hasselbachplatz

References

Hasselbachplatz
Railway stations in Germany opened in 1974
1974 establishments in East Germany